The nine South Vanuatu languages form a family of the Southern Oceanic languages, spoken in Tafea Province (Tanna, Aneityum, Futuna, Erromango, and Aniwa) of Vanuatu.

Languages
Erromango family
Southern: Sie, Sorung†
Northern: Ifo (Utaha)†, Ura(See Erromanga language#Linguistic situation for a description)
Tanna family 
Southern: Kwamera (South Tanna), Southwest Tanna
Northern: Lenakel (West Tanna), Whitesands (Weasisi, East Tanna), North Tanna
Aneityum
Aneityum (Anejom̃)

François (2015)
François (2015:18-21) lists the following names and locations for the 9 South Vanuatu languages.

Proto-South Vanuatu

Proto-South Vanuatu was reconstructed by John Lynch in 2001.

The language, compared to Proto-Oceanic, went through a series of vowel reductions, leading to the creation of a new vowel written as *ə, such as in *na-waiR "fresh water" resulting in Proto-South Vanuatu *nə-wai of the same meaning.

However, it also preserves some, but not all final consonants. For example, *tanum "to plant, bury" is reflected in Proto-South Vanuatu as *(a)-tenum "to bury", but *taŋis "to cry" is instead reflected as *(a)-taŋi.

Vowels
The vowels of Proto-South Vanuatu, according to Lynch, are:

Consonants
The consonants of Proto-South Vanuatu, according to Lynch, are:
 {| class="wikitable" style="text-align:center"
|+Consonants
! colspan="2" |
!Labiovelar
!Bilabial
!Alveolar
!Palatal
!Velar
!Uvular
|-
! rowspan="2" |Stop
!voiced
|*
|*
|*
|
|*
|
|-
!voiceless
|*
|*
|*
|
|*
|*
|-
! colspan="2" |Nasal
|*
|*
|*
|
|*
|
|-
! colspan="2" |Fricative
|*
|
|*
|*, *
|*
|
|-
! colspan="2" |Approximant
|*
|
|*, *
|*
|
|
|}

References 

 .
Lynch, John. 2001. The linguistic history of southern Vanuatu. (Pacific Linguistics, 509.) Canberra: Pacific Linguistics.

 
Languages of Vanuatu
Southern Oceanic languages